Flaming Gorge Reservoir is the largest reservoir in  Wyoming, on the Green River, impounded behind the Flaming Gorge Dam. Construction on the dam began in 1958 and was completed in 1964.

Location
The reservoir is mainly in southwest Wyoming and partially in northeastern Utah.
The lake straddles the Utah-Wyoming border. The nearby town of Dutch John, Utah, was built to serve as a base camp during construction of the dam, and as an administrative site afterwards.

Geology
The foundation of the reservoir is a steep-sided narrow canyon composed of siliceous sandstone and hard quartzites inter-bedded with softer shales, siltstones, and argillites.

Recreation
Visitors enjoy hiking, boating, fishing, windsurfing, camping, backpacking, cross-country skiing, and snowmobiling within Flaming Gorge National Recreation Area, which is operated by  Ashley National Forest.  Camp sites can be found close to the dam and along Highway 191 for a fee, as well as free throughout the area. Campgrounds operated by the U.S. Forest Service close in the winter months, with the exception of Dripping Springs near Dutch John. There are also public camp sites at Buck Board and Lucerne Marinas, along Highway 530 on the west side of the reservoir. The many available fish species in the reservoir and surrounding lakes are Colorado River Cutthroat trout, Brown trout, Rainbow trout, Lake trout, Kokanee salmon, Smallmouth bass, Burbot and Common carp. The Green River is a popular spot for fishing, mainly below the dam. The river's ice cold water and beautiful structure make it a world class, world-renowned fly fishing stream.

See also
 List of largest reservoirs of Wyoming

Further reading
 Webb, Roy (2012). Lost Canyons of the Green River: The Story before Flaming Gorge Dam. .

External links

 Ashley National Forest: official Flaming Gorge National Recreation Area website
 Utah Division of Wildlife Resources: Flaming Gorge Reservoir 
    from the Utah Division of Water Quality
 Flaming Gorge Fishing Info
 United States Bureau of Reclamation−USBR.gov: Flaming Gorge Dam Environmental Impact Statement

Reservoirs in Utah
Reservoirs in Wyoming
Green River (Colorado River tributary)
Lakes of Daggett County, Utah
Lakes of Sweetwater County, Wyoming
Colorado River Storage Project
Ashley National Forest
Energy infrastructure completed in 1964
1964 in Utah
1964 in Wyoming
Protected areas of Daggett County, Utah
Protected areas of Sweetwater County, Wyoming
1964 establishments in Wyoming